Serratina is a genus of marine bivalve molluscs, in the subfamily Tellininae of the family Tellinidae.

Nomenclature
Originally introduced as a section of Tellina (Eurytellina).

Species

Synonyms
 Serratina eugonia (Suter, 1913): synonym of Serratina charlottae (E. A. Smith, 1885)
 Serratina margaritina (Lamarck, 1818): synonym of Tellinides margaritinus (Lamarck, 1818)
 Serratina subtruncata (Hanley, 1844): synonym of Pristipagia subtruncata (Hanley, 1844)
 Serratina sulcata (Wood, 1815): synonym of Serratina fissa (Spengler, 1798)
 Serratina tokunagai (Ikebe, 1936): synonym of Ardeamya tokunagai (Ikebe, 1936)

References

 Thiele, J. (1929-1935). Handbuch der systematischen Weichtierkunde. Jena, Gustav Fischer, 1154 pp. Vol. 1 part 1: 1-376
 Keen A.M. 1969. Superfamily Tellinacea. Pp. N613-N643, In R.C. Moore (ed.), Treatise on Invertebrate Paleontology, Part N: Mollusca 6, Bivalvia. Geological Society of America and University of Kansas Press, Lawrence.

External links
 Pallary, P. (1920). Exploration scientifique du Maroc organisée par la Société de Géographie de Paris et continuée par la Société des Sciences Naturelles du Maroc. Deuxième fascicule. Malacologie. i>Larose, Rabat et Paris pp. 108. 1(1): map
 Lamy, E. (1918). Les Tellines de la Mer Rouge (d'apres les materiaux recueillis par M. le Dr. Jousseaume). Bulletin du Muséum National d'Histoire Naturelle, Paris. 24: 26-33, 116-124, 167-172
  Finlay, H. J. (1926). A further commentary on New Zealand molluscan systematics. Transactions of the New Zealand Institute. 57: 320-485, pls 18-23

Tellinidae
Bivalve genera